NGC 3561, also known as Arp 105, is a pair of interacting galaxies NGC 3561A and NGC 3561B within the galaxy cluster Abell 1185 in Ursa Major. Its common name is "the Guitar" and contains a small tidal dwarf galaxy known as Ambartsumian's Knot that is believed to be the remnant of the extensive tidal tail pulled out of one of the galaxies.

References

External links
 
 Abell 1185 and Ambartsumian's Knot
 

Interacting galaxies
Lenticular galaxies
LINER galaxies
3561
6224
105
Abell 1185
Ursa Major (constellation)
033991